'Jake Putnam' is a former Emmy-winning journalist who currently works in public relations in Boise, Idaho. Putnam was born in Pocatello, Idaho November 22, 1956, and is a graduate of Pocatello High School and Idaho State University. Putnam began his career in 1984 as a photographer for KIFI television in Idaho Falls. In 1985, he worked his way up to general assignment reporter in the Pocatello Bureau.

In 1987, Putnam was hired as a general assignment and political reporter for KTVB in Boise. In 1995, Putnam won an Emmy and in his 16-year career won awards from the Associated Press, United Press International, Idaho Press Club and the Society of Professional Journalists. In 1997, Putnam was nominated for another Emmy and named Moderator of the public affairs program, Viewpoint. Viewpoint finished number in the ratings in all three years under Putnam's reign.

Putnam played Division I college tennis at Idaho State and worked for tennis legend Frank X. Brennan as head pro at Mercersburg Academy. Thirty years later, he's still playing with a year-end national ranking of 19 in 2014, 22 in 2015 and 26 in doubles in the USTA's Men's 55 Division. In June 2012, Putnam reached a personal best and was ranked 395 in the World ITF rankings. That year he played in the  World Championships, winning two qualifying matches before losing the second round. In 2015 Putnam was named to the United States Osuna Cup team and has played on three consecutive teams. Putnam played in the Acapulco match in which the US team defeated Mexico in a tie 15–12.

In the 2012 US Senior games, Putnam finished 4th in Houston losing in a close semi-final match. Overall He's won 12 Gold Medals in the Idaho Senior Games Since 2007 bringing his tennis career record to 16 medals over the past ten years.

Putnam now works with the Idaho Farm Bureau as the state Broadcast Services Manager and writes for the Producer and Quarterly magazines.

Source: Ada County Historic Preservation Council, Boise, Idaho

 https://web.archive.org/web/20110718202118/http://www.adaweb.net/Portals/0/HPC/images/JakePutnamBio.jpg

1956 births
Living people
Emmy Award winners
Idaho State University alumni